Hellula kempae, or Kemp's hellula moth, is a moth in the family Crambidae. It was described by Eugene G. Munroe in 1972. It is found in North America, where it has been recorded from Alabama, Florida, Mississippi, South Carolina and Texas. It is also found in Cuba.

The forewing ground colour is ochre, with distinct pattern elements, consisting of a reniform spot with a few shining scales. The hindwings are light ochre brown, usually with a greyish-brown subterminal line and with greyish-brown terminal spots. Adults have been recorded on wing from March to August and from October to December.

References

Moths described in 1972
Glaphyriini